186th may refer to:

186th (2/2nd West Riding) Brigade, formation of the Territorial Force of the British Army
186th (Kent) Battalion, CEF, unit in the Canadian Expeditionary Force during the First World War
186th Aero Squadron, an Air Service, United States Army unit that fought on the Western Front during World War I
186th Air Refueling Wing, unit of the Mississippi Air National Guard stationed at Key Field Air National Guard Base, Mississippi
186th Airlift Squadron, unit of the Montana Air National Guard 120th Airlift Wing located at Great Falls Air National Guard Base, Montana
186th Infantry Regiment (United States), combat regiment of the United States Army made up of soldiers from the Oregon Army National Guard
186th New York State Legislature consists of the New York State Senate and the New York State Assembly
186th Ohio Infantry (or 186th OVI), an infantry regiment in the Union Army during the American Civil War
186th Street (Manhattan), New York
Pennsylvania's 186th Representative District, located in Philadelphia County, United States of America

See also
186 (number)
186, the year 186 (CLXXXVI) of the Julian calendar
186 BC